Fermín Trujillo Fuentes (born 18 September 1966) is a Mexican politician affiliated with the New Alliance Party (formerly to the Institutional Revolutionary Party). He served as Deputy of the LIX Legislature of the Mexican Congress representing Sonora and as Senator of the LX Legislature as replacement of Alfonso Elías Serrano.

He was the first person to serve three consecutive terms in the Congress of Sonora.

References

1966 births
Living people
Politicians from Sonora
Members of the Senate of the Republic (Mexico)
Members of the Chamber of Deputies (Mexico)
Institutional Revolutionary Party politicians
New Alliance Party (Mexico) politicians
Members of the Congress of Sonora
People from Ures Municipality